Action Group may refer to:

 Action group (sociology), or task group, a group of people joined temporarily to accomplish some task or take part in some organized collective action
 Action Group (Nigeria), a Nigerian political party established in Ibadan on March 21, 1951, by Chief Obafemi Awolowo
 Action (group theory), a way of describing symmetries of objects using groups
 Action Group (conglomerate), a business conglomerate based in India founded by Lala Mange Ram Agarwal
 Another name for a task group or military task force

See also
Group action (disambiguation)